Bestiario is a book of eight short stories written by Julio Cortázar. All the stories (except "Cefalea" and "Circe") were translated to English by Paul Blackburn and included in the collection End of the Game and Other Stories (1967). The "Cefalea" ("Headache") was translated in English by Michael Cisco in 2014 and published online by tor.com.

Stories
 "Casa Tomada" ("House Taken Over")
 "Carta a una señorita en París" (Letter to a Young Lady in Paris")
 "Lejana" ("The Distances")
 "Ómnibus" ("Omnibus")
 "Cefalea" ("Headache")
 "Circe" ("Circe")
 "Las puertas del cielo" ("The Gates of Heaven")
 "Bestiario" ("Bestiary")

References

1951 short story collections
Postmodern books
Short story collections by Julio Cortázar